Sandeep Khurana is a US based music composer, record producer, singer, and filmmaker originally from India.

He has produced and directed short films and documentaries, and released more than 100 music albums in the genres of new-age music, Western classical music, dance music and world music. His works on yoga, Reiki, chakras, mantras and world music are available online and his music is aired on radio channels worldwide, released under the label of SK Infinity World Media.

He has produced documentaries on different forms of yoga, e.g. Reiki, pranayama, chakras, mantras, and meditation.  Newspapers and magazines in the US (India West, India Currents and more), UK (Positive Health), South Asian and Canada (Starbuzz Weekly) have published features about his works.  He has published several articles on yoga music, music as a form of healing, and mudra yoga.

His popular new-age music albums include Yoga Philharmonic in 5 volumes, Yoga Music by SK Infinity, New Age Yoga Music, Shiva Mantra Chants by SK Infinity, and Yoga Music and Guided Meditations.  His music is a unique blend of Eastern and Western sounds, including acoustic music as well as electronic music.   He also produced two instrumental albums on the compositions of Bollywood composer R.D. Burman, also known as Rahul Dev Burman.  They are titled RD Burman: The Digital Way, Volume 1 and Volume 2. He produced another instrumental music album, titled Kishore Kumar The Gifted Voice Instrumentals, as a tribute to the Bollywood singer Kishore Kumar, popularly known as Kishoreda.  Indian Express (North American Edition) published a feature on his music albums in September 2009. Originally from New Delhi, India, he studied music from several prestigious music schools around the world including Ali Akbar College of Music, and then at Asian Academy of Film & Television, where he studied film making, film direction and television journalism.  Prior to pursuing music and film, he studied computer engineering at Delhi Institute of Technology, University of Delhi.

His music continues to be ranked high in iTunes' Top 100 New Age music charts in UK, Australia, Netherlands, Norway, Mexico, Sweden and other countries since 2010.  His music has been part of TV productions on STAR TV, Channel V, KMVT15 (California), and other TV channels worldwide.  The radio station SKY.FM listed him among its most played artists in the new-age music category.

In 2010, he produced a series of albums group-titled Osho Music Lounge as a dedication to the Indian spiritual mystic Osho.  Osho Music Lounge features fusion music, with nature sounds mixed with acoustic guitars and electronic synthesizers. In 2011, he released another series of new-age and world music albums, group-titled Yoga Philharmonic in several volumes.

He composed the theme song for a world music concert held in California on 4 November 2011.  The concert was a kickoff for a series of world music events titled "Singing for a Greener Tomorrow", organised by singingrecord.com.  Sandeep Khurana was nominated for Silicon Valley Award – Media & Short Films in California by a Sheetal Ohri Inc in October 2012.

Discographies
 Love in the Rainbow New Age Music Voices (2012)
 Sacred Chants Ensemble (2012)
 Ethereal Buddha Vibes for Meditation (2012)
 Endless Numinous String Ensemble (2012)
 Moods and Music World Classical (2012)
 LoVe Dance InVisible (2011)
 Yoga Philharmonic Vol. 1 Enlightenment World Music Album (2011)
 Yoga Philharmonic Vol. 2 Ethereal New Age Music Album (2011)
 Yoga Philharmonic Vol. 3 in Voice Harmony World Music Album (2011)
 Yoga Philharmonic Vol. 4 Ethereal Chakra Sounds World Music Album (2011)
 Yoga Philharmonic Vol. 5 Zen Meditation World Music Album (2011)
 Shri Hanuman Chalisa, Symphony of Sacred Chants World Music Album (2011)
 Shiva Mantras Sacred Chants Spiritual Music Album (2011)
 Crescendo World Music Album (2007)
 Kishore Kumar The Gifted Voice Instrumentals (2009), SK Infinity World Media
 RD Burman The Digital Way Instrumentals (2009), SK Infinity World Media
 Yoga Music by SK Infinity (2009), SK Infinity World Media
 Digital Percussion World Dance (2009), SK Infinity World Media
 RD Burman The Digital Way Vol 2 Instrumentals (2009), SK Infinity World Media
 Ethereal Chakra Sounds by SK Infinity (2009), SK Infinity World Media
 Shiva Mantra Chants by SK Infinity (2009), SK Infinity World Media
 New Age Yoga Music by SK Infinity (2009), SK Infinity World Media
 Nature Sounds Music for Relaxation (2009), SK Infinity World Media
 Zen Osho Music Lounge (2010), SK Infinity World Media
 Chakra Guided Meditation (2010), SK Infinity World Media
 Yoga Music and Guided Meditations (2010), SK Infinity World Media
 Yoga Music in Ten Volumes Volume 1 (Meditation) (2010), SK Infinity World Media
 Yoga Music in Ten Volumes Volume 2 (Infinite Elements) (2010), SK Infinity World Media
 Yoga Music in Ten Volumes Volume 7 (Tantra)(2011), SK Infinity World Media
 Reiki Healing Music by SK Infinity (2009), SK Infinity World Media
 Mantra Chants on New Age Music (2011), SK Infinity World Media

See also
New-age music
Yanni
Enya
Rahul Dev Burman
Classical music
World music
Indian music
Yoga
Reiki
Meditation

References

External links
 
Official Website

Links to Music by Sandeep Khurana on Pandora Radio

Indian film score composers
Film directors from Delhi
Living people
Year of birth missing (living people)